John Archibald Clark (August 24, 1883 - February 26, 1950) was an American lawyer and Democratic politician. He was a member of the Mississippi State Senate from 1916 to 1920.

Early life 
John Archibald Clark was born on August 24, 1883, in Pea Ridge, Kemper County, Mississippi. He was the son of Alexander John Clark, a South Carolina native, and Frances Jane (Henson) Clark. Clark attended the high schools of Cleveland, Mississippi, and then the Cooper Institute in Daleyville, Mississippi. Clark graduated from Millsaps College of Law in 1903 and was admitted to the bar. He then moved to DeKalb, Mississippi, to practice law.

Professional career 
From 1913 to 1915, Clark was a member of the Board of Aldermen and the City Attorney of DeKalb. Also in 1915, Clark was the attorney for the Board of Supervisors of Kemper County, Mississippi. In 1915, Clark was elected to represent the 15th district in the Mississippi State Senate and served from 1916 to 1920.

Personal life 
Clark died on February 26, 1940, in a hospital in Jackson, Mississippi. Clark's widow, Tillie, represented Kemper County in the Mississippi House of Representatives from 1940 to 1944.

References 

1883 births
1940 deaths
Democratic Party Mississippi state senators
People from De Kalb, Mississippi
20th-century American politicians